Troutman is a town in Iredell County, North Carolina, United States. As of the 2020 census the town's population was 3,698. Due to substantial residential growth in the area, as well as neighborhood annexation, the town is experiencing dramatic population growth. Approved residential developments, when completed, are forecast to increase town population to more than 11,000 residents.

History
The Davidson House was added to the National Register of Historic Places in 1980.

Geography
Troutman is located in south-central Iredell County at  (35.703149, −80.892255). U.S. Route 21 passes through the center of the town, leading north  to Statesville, the county seat, and south  to Mooresville.

Demographics

2020 census

As of the 2020 United States census, there were 3,698 people, 995 households, and 707 families residing in the town.

2000 census
As of the census of 2000, there were 1,592 people, 638 households, and 449 families residing in the town. The population density was 765.5 people per square mile (295.5/km2). There were 695 housing units at an average density of 334.2 per square mile (129.0/km2). The racial makeup of the town was 70.73% White, 28.02% African American, 0.31% Native American, 0.25% Asian, 0.19% from other races, and 0.50% from two or more races. Hispanic or Latino of any race were 0.31% of the population.

There were 638 households, out of which 30.4% had children under the age of 18 living with them, 52.0% were married couples living together, 12.5% had a female householder with no husband present, and 29.6% were non-families. 25.7% of all households were made up of individuals, and 10.0% had someone living alone who was 65 years of age or older. The average household size was 2.50 and the average family size was 2.99.

In the town, the population was spread out, with 24.6% under the age of 18, 7.9% from 18 to 24, 28.0% from 25 to 44, 24.9% from 45 to 64, and 14.8% who were 65 years of age or older. The median age was 39 years. For every 100 females, there were 92.0 males. For every 100 females age 18 and over, there were 89.7 males.

The median income for a household in the town was $41,786, and the median income for a family was $47,569. Males had a median income of $31,071 versus $22,813 for females. The per capita income for the town was $19,261. About 5.2% of families and 6.0% of the population were below the poverty line, including 6.6% of those under age 18 and 4.7% of those age 65 or over.

Notable people
DaBaby, rapper 
Jim Lauderdale, singer-songwriter
Josh Richeson, NASCAR driver

References

External links
 

Towns in Iredell County, North Carolina
Towns in North Carolina
Populated places established in 1859